Amphiesma monticola, also known as the Wynad keelback, is a harmless colubrid snake species endemic to the Western Ghats of India, where it has been recorded in the Kodagu and Wayanad regions.

Description

Adults are small and slender and found in leaf litter in forest habitats. The head is reddish. The body is brownish with a greenish gloss, while some individuals are bright green.

This species has 19 keeled dorsal scale rows at midbody, 133–144 ventrals. The anal scale is divided, and it has 78–92 subcaudals, which are also divided. There are 8 supralabials with the 3rd, 4th and 5th touching the eye. There is one preocular scale.

Description from G. A. Boulenger, The Fauna of British India, Including Ceylon and Burma:

References

monticola
Reptiles of India
Endemic fauna of the Western Ghats
Reptiles described in 1853
Taxa named by Thomas C. Jerdon